Henrardia is a genus of Asian plants in the grass family.

 Species
 Henrardia persica (Boiss.) C.E.Hubb. - Kazakhstan, Kyrgyzstan, Turkmenistan, Uzbekistan, Tajikistan, Afghanistan, Iran, Turkey, Pakistan, Syria, Lebanon
 Henrardia pubescens C.E.Hubb. - Syria, Lebanon, Israel, Palestine, Jordan, Iraq, Iran

References

Pooideae
Poaceae genera
Grasses of Asia
Flora of Central Asia
Flora of Western Asia
Taxa named by Charles Edward Hubbard